Sergei Mošnikov (born 7 January 1988) is an Estonian professional footballer who plays as a midfielder for Paide Linnameeskond.

Club career

Early career
Mošnikov came through the youth system at Pärnu. He made his senior league debut while on loan at Vaprus in the Esiliiga. In September 2005, Mošnikov joined sc Heerenveen academy in the Netherlands.

Flora
In July 2006, Mošnikov returned to Estonia and joined Flora. He made his debut in the Meistriliiga on 9 July 2006, in a 0–1 home loss to Levadia. Mošnikov won two Meistriliiga titles in 2010 and 2011.

Pogoń Szczecin
On 21 December 2011, Mošnikov signed a two-and-half-year contract with Polish club Pogoń Szczecin. He failed to break into the first team as his club finished the 2011–12 I liga as runners up and were promoted to the Ekstraklasa. Mošnikov made his debut in the Ekstraklasa on 29 September 2012, in 1–1 home draw against Jagiellonia Białystok.

Górnik Zabrze
On 26 January 2013, Mošnikov moved to Polish club Górnik Zabrze on a one-year deal, with the option to extend the contract for two and a half years. He scored his first Ekstraklasa goal on 2 June 2013, in a 2–0 away win over Lechia Gdańsk.

Kaysar Kyzylorda
On 24 February 2014, Mošnikov signed a one-year contract with Kazakhstan Premier League club Kaysar Kyzylorda.

Return to Flora
On 4 September 2014, Mošnikov signed a contract with his former club Flora until the end of the 2014 season.

Tobol Kostanay
On 9 February 2015, Mošnikov signed a one-year contract with Kazakh club Tobol Kostanay.

Infonet
On 11 February 2016, Mošnikov returned to Estonia and signed a one-year contract with Infonet. He won his third Meistriliiga title in the 2016 season.

Minsk
On 15 February 2017, Mošnikov signed a one-year contract with Belarusian club Minsk. He made his debut in the Belarusian Premier League on 1 April 2017, scoring in a 2–2 home draw against Dynamo Brest. On 5 July 2017, Mošnikov was released from his contract with Minsk by mutual agreement.

PS Kemi
On 18 July 2017, Mošnikov signed for Finnish club PS Kemi until the end of the 2017 season.

Górnik Łęczna
On 8 March 2018, Mošnikov signed for Polish club Górnik Łęczna.

Shakhter Karagandy
On 26 July 2018, Mošnikov joined Kazakh club Shakhter Karagandy on a six-month deal, with the option for the club to extend his contract. He left the club again at the end of 2018.

International career
Mošnikov made his senior international debut for Estonia on 19 June 2010, replacing Gert Kams in the 73rd minute of a 0–0 draw against Latvia at the 2010 Baltic Cup. He scored his first international goal on 7 October 2016, in a 4–0 home win over Gibraltar in a qualification match for the 2018 FIFA World Cup.

Statistics
As of 12 November 2018. Estonia score listed first, score column indicates score after each Mošnikov goal.

International goals

Honours

Club
Flora
Meistriliiga: 2010, 2011
Estonian Cup: 2007–08, 2008–09,  2010–11
Estonian Supercup: 2009, 2011

Infonet
Meistriliiga: 2016

Individual
Meistriliiga Player of the Year: 2011

References

External links

1988 births
Living people
Sportspeople from Pärnu
Estonian footballers
Estonian people of Russian descent
Association football midfielders
Esiliiga players
Pärnu JK Vaprus players
SC Heerenveen players
Meistriliiga players
FC Flora players
FCI Tallinn players
Ekstraklasa players
Pogoń Szczecin players
Górnik Zabrze players
Kazakhstan Premier League players
FC Kaisar players
FC Tobol players
FC Shakhter Karagandy players
Belarusian Premier League players
FC Minsk players
Veikkausliiga players
Kemi City F.C. players
I liga players
Górnik Łęczna players
FK Palanga players
Paide Linnameeskond players
Estonia youth international footballers
Estonia under-21 international footballers
Estonia international footballers
Estonian expatriate footballers
Estonian expatriate sportspeople in the Netherlands
Expatriate footballers in the Netherlands
Estonian expatriate sportspeople in Poland
Expatriate footballers in Poland
Estonian expatriate sportspeople in Kazakhstan
Expatriate footballers in Kazakhstan
Estonian expatriate sportspeople in Belarus
Expatriate footballers in Belarus
Estonian expatriate sportspeople in Finland
Expatriate footballers in Finland
Estonian expatriate sportspeople in Lithuania
Expatriate footballers in Lithuania